Tim or Timothy Reagan or Regan may refer to:

Timothy G. Reagan (born 1956), educator
Tim Reagan, character in Alias Mary Flynn
Tim Regan (born 1981), soccer player
Timothy Regan (racehorse trainer), see King Edward Stakes
Tim Regan (ice hockey) (born 1949), American former ice hockey goaltender